The 1982 Georgia Tech Yellow Jackets football team represented the Georgia Institute of Technology during the 1982 NCAA Division I-A football season. The Yellow Jackets were led by third-year head coach Bill Curry, and played their home games at Grant Field in Atlanta. It was their last year competing as football independents before joining the Atlantic Coast Conference in 1983.

Schedule

Roster

References

Georgia Tech
Georgia Tech Yellow Jackets football seasons
Georgia Tech Yellow Jackets football